Ramchandra Parab (1922 – 1 August 2006) was a footballer who represented India in the 1948 London Olympics.

References

Sources

External links
 

1922 births
2006 deaths
Indian footballers
India international footballers
Footballers from Mumbai
Footballers at the 1948 Summer Olympics
Olympic footballers of India
Association football forwards
Calcutta Football League players
Mumbai Football League players